The Commercial Free EP is a live album recorded by North Carolina hip hop group, Little Brother, in Raleigh, North Carolina on October 9, 2005 and released in 2006.  Many of its tracks were included on Little Brother's 2005 album, The Minstrel Show, but some are brand new. The album has an anti-music industry sentiment and discuss various topics such as how they have to create three more tracks for the Japanese versions of their albums on "The Japanese People Never Took It".

Track listing
Tracks 10-14 are described as "Bonus Outtakes & Bloopers" within the album's information booklet and are not songs.

Samples
Watch Me
"With A Child's Heart" as performed by Michael Jackson; written by Victoria Basemore, Henry Cosby and Sylvia May
The Olio
"Ain't No Love Last" as performed by Curtis Mayfield; written by Linda Clifford and Curtis Mayfield
Slow It Down
"Slow Dance" as performed by David Ruffin; written by C. Curtis Gadson, Rosslyn Sanders and Rollin Sanders
Hold On (Tellin' Me)
"Sitting On The Edge Of My Mind" as performed by Jermaine Jackson; written by Garfield, Fletcher, O'Hara and O'Hara
The Becoming
"Circles" as performed by Rufus & Chaka Khan; written by Tom Dulaine
Sincerely Yours
"Whatever Goes Around" as performed by Jerry Butler; written by T. Callier and L. Wade
Lovin' It
"One Night Affair" as performed by The Stylistics; written by R. Joyce, V. Pike and T. Randazzo
Still Lives Through
"Oh My God" by A Tribe Called Quest and Busta Rhymes (Vocals by Busta Rhymes)

Little Brother (group) albums
Albums produced by 9th Wonder
Live EPs
2006 EPs
2006 live albums